These are the number-one albums in the United States per Billboard magazine's Best-Selling LPs chart during the year 1959. Starting May 25, 1959, separate charts were listed for albums in mono and stereo formats, called Best-Selling Monophonic LPs and Best-Selling Stereophonic LPs, respectively.

Chart history through May 18

Chart history May 25 to end of year

See also
List of number-one albums (United States)

References

1959
Number-one albums of 1959 (U.S.)